Håndslag was a Norwegian bi-weekly political magazine issued in Stockholm from June 1942 to June 1945. It was issued by Eyvind Johnson, and edited by Torolf Elster. Among the journalists were Willy Brandt and Helge Krog. The magazine was secretly distributed in occupied Norway. Towards the end of the war it had a circulation of 15,000–20,000 copies.

References

1942 establishments in Sweden
1945 disestablishments in Sweden
Biweekly magazines published in Sweden
Defunct magazines published in Sweden
Defunct political magazines
Magazines established in 1942
Magazines disestablished in 1945
Magazines published in Stockholm
Norwegian-language magazines
Political magazines published in Sweden
Political magazines published in Norway